GNU Common Lisp (GCL) is the GNU Project's ANSI Common Lisp compiler, an evolutionary development of Kyoto Common Lisp.  It produces native object code by first generating C code and then calling a C compiler.

GCL is the implementation of choice for several large projects including the mathematical tools Maxima, AXIOM, HOL88, and ACL2. GCL runs under eleven different architectures on Linux, and under FreeBSD, Solaris, Mac OS X, and Microsoft Windows.

Last stable release of GCL is of 2023-01-13.

See also

CLISP – another GNU Project Common Lisp implementation

References

Common Lisp implementations
Common Lisp (programming language) software
Free compilers and interpreters
Common Lisp
GNU Project Lisp programming language implementations